Brydges may refer to:
David Brydges (born 1949), English-American-Canadian mathematical physicist
Elizabeth Brydges (c. 1575–1617), English courtier
George Brydges (disambiguation)
Grey Brydges, 5th Baron Chandos (ca. 1580–1621), English nobleman
Henry Brydges (disambiguation)
James Brydges (disambiguation)
John Brydges, 1st Baron Chandos (1492–1557), English Member of Parliament
Samuel Egerton Brydges (1762–1837), English bibliographer and genealogist

See also
Harford Jones-Brydges (1764–1847), British diplomat and author
Bridges (surname)